Events in the year 2012 in Latvia.

Incumbents
President - Andris Bērziņš
Prime Minister - Valdis Dombrovskis
Speaker - Solvita Āboltiņa

Events
2012 Latvian constitutional referendum

Arts and entertainment
In music: Latvia in the Eurovision Song Contest 2012.

Sports
Latvia at the 2012 Summer Olympics, Football (soccer) competitions: Baltic League, Latvian Higher League, Latvian Football Cup. See also: List of Latvian football transfers winter 2011-2012.

References

 
2010s in Latvia
Years of the 21st century in Latvia
Latvia
Latvia